Chumdeo or Chum Fra Rung Mung or Chumpha is an Ahom deity or the god of heaven in the Furalung custom. The Ahom kings worshipped and kept it in the Deoghar alongside the royal palace. It was customary to hang Chumdeo around king’s neck at the coronation of the new king or Singarigharutha ceremony.   It was given by his maternal grandmother to the first Ahom king Sukapha and he brought Chumdeo with him while he crossed the Patkai mountain and came to Assam. According to public belief, Chumdeo grants infinite wealth and with the deity in possession the enemy cannot win over. The size and shape of the Chumdeo is not much known though it is described to be a stone. According to some sources the shape of this stone is like a heron. It was kept in a small box in a golden seat.  Chumdeo disappeared after the end of the Ahom reign in Assam.

Origin
According to legends, the king of heaven, Lengdon, entrusted Chumdeo tohis brother's sons, Khun-lung and Khun-lai, to reign on the earth. Later, the statue of Chumdeo came into the hands of Sukapha's step-brother Sukhranpha. Sukapha’s maternal grandmother secretly handed over it to him on his way to Assam. According to Ahom religion the Ahoms did not worship idols. So there is no statue of the deity as mentioned in their religious texts. Only the member of the royal family kept two images, Chum and Seng. They were of bright colour (Rung) and both presided over ‘mung’ i.e. the country. So this images were only in the hands of the royal family who is responsible for ruling the country and was also known as Chumdeo and Sengdeo. According to belief, Chumdeo gave infinite wealth and had to be kept very secret. Some scholars suggest that the heron-shaped chumdeu could also be a statue of the dragon in ancient China and Myanmar. Seng is also considered to be a female dragon who accompanies Chum.

References

Ahom kingdom